The Australian Network for Art and Technology (ANAT), was founded by the Australian Experimental Art Foundation (then the Experimental Art Foundation) in 1988. ANAT is a nonprofit organization that provides tools to assist Australian artists, particularly those in media arts. Its programming includes workshops, publications, and immersive residencies.

The Network currently has 10 employees and is located in Adelaide, South Australia. It currently trades under the Association Incorporations Act 1985, and operates with partners both nationally and internationally.

References

Arts councils
Arts organisations based in Australia
Arts organizations established in 1994